HMS Retriever was a Thornycroft-built  destroyer which served with the Royal Navy during the First World War. Launched in 1917, the vessel formed part of the Harwich Force and took part in operations off the coast of Ostend in support of the bombardment of the town in June that year. During August the following year, the vessel attempted to deploy a seaplane from a towed lighter, but a lack of wind meant the operation was unsuccessful. The vessel was also jointly credited with the destruction of the submarine  that year, although this has been disputed. After the war, the ship was placed in reserve and was sold to be broken up in 1927.

Design and development
Retriever was one of three  destroyers ordered by the British Admiralty from Thornycroft of Woolston, Southampton, in July 1915 as part of the Sixth War Construction Programme. The ships differed from the six preceding  built by the yard, in having all geared turbines and the aft gun being raised on a bandstand. Like other Thornycroft-built vessels, they differed from the rest of the R class in having flat sided funnels.

Three funnels were fitted.

Armament consisted of three single  Mk IV guns on the ship's centreline, with one on the forecastle, one aft on a raised bandstand and one between the second and third funnels. A single 2-pounder  "pom-pom" anti-aircraft gun was carried, along with four  torpedoes in two twin rotating mounts.

Construction and career
Retriever was laid down in January 1916 and launched on 15 January 1917. On being completed in March 1917, the ship joined the Harwich Force, serving as part of the Tenth Destroyer Flotilla until the end of the war. The flotilla was tasked with patrolling Schouwen Bank, but encountered no opposition. Between 16 and 17 October, the destroyer was again called upon to be part of an even larger force of 84 warships sent out to search for a German fleet based around a minelayer, although once again Retriever saw no action.

Retriever was subsequently equipped to tow a lighter which carried a seaplane, but a lack of wind meant that operations were curtailed at the first attempt to launch the aircraft on 10 August. Placed in reserve after the Armistice, Retriever was allocated to the Home Fleet, serving under the dreadnought battleship . However, in 1923, the Navy decided to scrap many of the older destroyers in preparation for the introduction of newer and larger vessels. The destroyer was sold for breaking up on 26 July 1927 to Hughes Bolckow of Blyth.

Pennant numbers

References

Citations

Bibliography

 
 
 
 
 
 

 

1917 ships
R-class destroyers (1916)
Ships built by John I. Thornycroft & Company
Ships built in Southampton
World War I destroyers of the United Kingdom